Manlio Vinciguerra (born 1976 in Catania, Italy) is a scientist (PhD) specialized in epigenetics and aging research. He held Faculty positions at the Medical University of Varna, Varna, Bulgaria, at the International Clinical Research Center (FNUSA-ICRC), Brno, Czech Republic, and at the University College London (UCL), London, United Kingdom.

He received his PhD in Internal Medicine (2004) and research training at the University of Geneva, Switzerland, and at the European Molecular Biology Laboratory (EMBL), in Italy and in Germany (2005-2011). He obtained a degree in Biomolecular Sciences from the University of Catania, Italy, in 1999.

Vinciguerra unraveled important cellular signaling and epigenetics mechanisms involved in metabolic processes, stress and aging in the heart and in the liver, such as PI3K/AKT/mTOR pathway, histone variants and sirtuins, using a systems biology approach in cells and rodent models. He is a member of Who's Who in Gerontology.

References 

People from Catania
1976 births
Living people